Indonesia's Next Top Model (abbreviated as INTM) is an Indonesian reality television series based on Tyra Banks' America's Next Top Model, which features a group of young women who compete for the title of "Indonesia's Next Top Model" and a chance to begin their career in the modeling industry. The series began to air on NET. starting from November 28, 2020.

Search for contestants
An extensive online search takes place for the selection process. Models of Indonesian descent or nationality are all allowed to apply, but they must be able to speak and write in English and Indonesian. Contestants who have previously participated in another Top Model franchise can still apply for the competition as long as they were not the winner, and are not currently under contractual obligations with an agency or endorsing any product or brand.

Format 

Each season of Indonesia's Next Top Model has about 40 regular episodes, with a special recap episode which airs near the end of each season. Each season generally begins with 16-18 contestants. Contestants are judged weekly on their overall appearance, participation in challenges, and their best photo or video from that week's photo or video shoot.

Each episode, one contestant is eliminated, though in rare cases a double elimination or non-elimination was given by consensus of the judging panel. Makeovers are given to contestants early in the season (usually after the first elimination) and a trip to an international destination is sometimes scheduled about two-thirds of the way through the season.

Differences from America's Next Top Model
In contrast the American version, the contestants receive instruction from a mentor who helps coach them in various aspects of the modelling industry and acts as a general assistant during photo shoots and challenges. The Indonesian version also airs twice a week instead of once a week like America.

Connection with Asia's Next Top Model
Indonesia's Next Top Model participants has been mentored or judged by former Indonesian representatives of Asia's Next Top Model. Patricia Gouw, runner-up of Asia's Next Top Model cycle 4 served as judge in the first cycle, while Ayu Gani, the winner of Asia's Next Top Model cycle 3 and Jesslyn Lim of Asia's Next Top Model cycle 6 were added as model mentor and guest judge. Later in cycle 2, Ayu Gani served as judge, replacing Patricia Gouw from the previous cycle. In cycle 3, former contestant of Asia's Next Top Model cycle 6, Iko Bustomi, competed as a contestant.

Judges 
Indonesian supermodel and actress, Luna Maya, and former mentalist, Deddy Corbuzier, were added to the original panel as the host and creative consultant of the show respectively, while fashion model, Patricia Gouw, and fashion choreographer, Panca Makmun, were added to the original panel as judge, catwalk coach, and main model mentor. Ayu Gani and Jesslyn Lim, Indonesian representatives from Asia's Next Top Model, were added as model mentors throughout the first cycle. For the second cycle, Corbuzier and Gouw left the show and are replaced by Gani and fashion designer Ivan Gunawan, who previously judged the first cycle as a guest judge.

Cycles

Controversies

Remarks about mental health

Ilene's Controversy
During a judging panel in cycle 1, Ilene (who later won the cycle) shared her battle with depression and eating disorder in response to Luna Maya’s question about her photoshoot concept in Anyer beach. Deddy Corbuzier then cut off Ilene’s story by saying "Depression? [...] You’re pretty, you’re a model. You’re also tall, sexy, and smart. If you’re depressed, you’re insulting the martabak (stuffed pancake) vendor in front of my house.” Luna also said "I really like eating, so [do I have an] eating disorder?"

These remarks were met with backlash from the viewers and general public who believed their remarks were obtuse and insensitive to the issue of mental disorder. Videos of their remarks went viral on social media, in which many took to Twitter and Instagram to express their disapproval and also sympathy for Ilene, including psychiatrists and celebrities, also the former Asia's Next Top Model host Nadya Hutagalung. Felicia Hutapea, the daughter of lawyer Hotman Paris Hutapea also openly criticized Luna and Deddy in her Instagram story, in which Luna responded through direct message that "everyone went through depression" and that [25-year-old Felicia] was "such a child". Luna and Deddy later apologized for their remarks through their Instagram. Those remarks subsequently were edited out from the episode in the show's official YouTube channel in response to the backlash.

Shynka's Controversy
During the elimination panel in cycle 3 episode 8, Shynka and Kezia landed in the bottom two. After, Luna Maya announced that Shynka would continue the competition, leaving Kezia to be eliminated, but it was then when Shynka declared that she wanted to quit the contest. She argued about how she never felt appreciated by the judges despite the amount of hard work and effort she gave during her time from week 1 until her elimination. Shynka felt that she cannot undergo the pressure of it, which caused her to quit. Luna responded with "If the judges didn't appreciate her [Shynka's] hard work, she wouldn't even able to be on the contest." Not long after, Luna posted her daily vlog on YouTube and towards the end of her vlog, she called Shynka bego [very stupid] and mocked her decision of quitting. Luna highly received criticism for her sensitive remarks towards Shynka in her comments section, and because of that, those statements were eventually edited out from the video.

The public reaction was a mix of positivity and negativity. Though they sympathized and respected Shynka's bravery for prioritizing mental health over winning the contest, some other people sided with Luna and reasoned that "Shynka should've known better that it would of course be a tough competition and her mental well-being should be prepared before joining the contest." People replied to this comment, claiming that "Shynka has an introverted personality, so it would be hard for her to receive comments and that they shouldn't blame Shynka for it."

Awards and nominations

See also 
 Indonesia's Next Top Model (cycle 1)
 Indonesia's Next Top Model (cycle 2)
 Indonesia's Next Top Model (cycle 3)

External links

References

~
Top Model
English-language television shows
Indonesian-language television shows
Non-American television series based on American television series
Television series by CBS Studios